Brittany Peters (born 18 April 1985) is a New Zealand stage, film and television actress, director, stunt performer and acting coach. She is best known for her recurring roles on the soap operas Shortland Street as Pania Stevens (2014–2015) and in Home and Away as Gemma Parata (2020).

Early life
Peters was born in New Zealand to Louise, a primary school teacher and Winston Peters, a former Deputy Prime Minister. She has one older sibling – a brother, Joel.

Career
Peters' acting career commenced in 2002 when she was cast in the stage production of Fame, based on the film of the same name; after which she entered formal training and attended the Toi Whakaari: NZ Drama School, graduating in 2006 with a Bachelor of Performing Arts degree. Following this, she attended the Actors Lab Workshop where she was trained by actress Miranda Harcourt. She continued in theatre before appearing in short films and then television, landing guest roles on The Almighty Johnsons, Go Girls, The Blue Rose and Nothing Trivial. She later underwent a Professional Practitioners course at the Massive Theatre Company.

In 2014, Peters began appearing in the medical soap opera Shortland Street as Dr. Pania Stevens. Her first major screen role, Peters' duration on the show lasted eight months on a recurring basis. Her role on the series was met with a mixed reception; viewers were highly critical of her portrayal as a villain and she was subjected to online bullying forcing her to close all her social media accounts, while others showed their support as she was praised for her performance and her acting skills.

In conjunction with her acting career, she began courses in stunt work for Cherokee Films New Zealand, and professional boxing where she trained at Fight Camp. In 2015, Peters competed in the Female Celebrity Fight category at the Super 8 Boxing Tournament, beating actress Lisa O'Loughlin.

For her performance in short film Every Moment, she earned the Te Tohu Auahatanga Award for Best Actress and the Viewers' Choice Award for Best Actress at the Tropfest New Zealand in 2015, while she was additionally nominated for a New Zealand Film Award for Best Actress in a Short Film.

In 2016, Peters travelled to the United States where she attended a three-month Summer course at the Atlantic Theater Company. Her subsequent television work followed with guest appearances on Find Me a Māori Bride, The Dead Lands and Fresh Eggs.

In 2019, it was announced that Peters would be cast in the Seven Network Australian soap opera Home and Away. She appeared as Gemma Parata, part of a Māori family who moves to Summer Bay under tragic circumstances. She made her first appearance in the ninety-minute opening episode of the 2020 season on 27 January. She departed the series in July 2020.

Theatre credits
 Fame – as Lambchops (2002)
 Antony and Cleopatra – as Cleopatra (2004) – Toi Whakaari: NZ Drama School
 Pegasus Moon – as Dancer (2005) – Toi Whakaari: NZ Drama School
 Stop Kiss – as Callie (2005) – Toi Whakaari: NZ Drama School
 Battles of the Heart – as Neva (2005) – Toi Whakaari: NZ Drama School
 The Seagull – as Polina (2005) – Toi Whakaari: NZ Drama School
 Stuff Happens – as Condoleezza Rice  (2005) – Toi Whakaari: NZ Drama School
 Cabaret – as Lead Soloist (2005) – Toi Whakaari: NZ Drama School
 Tape – as Amy (2006) – Toi Whakaari: NZ Drama School
 People Don't Sing When They're Feeling Sensible – as Lead (2006) – Toi Whakaari: NZ Drama School
 Peer Gynt – as Various roles (2006) – Toi Whakaari: NZ Drama School
 The Crucible – as Mercy Lewis (2007) – Auckland Theatre Company
 Whero's New Net – as Whero (2008) – Massive Theatre Company
 Life as a Dream – Various roles (2009) – Silo Theatre
 Whero's New Net (National Tour) – as Whero (2009) – Silo Theatre
 Havoc in the Garden – as Jani (2011) – Massive Theatre Company
 A Basement Christmas Carol – as Bobby Cratchet (2013) – Silo Theatre
 Hauraki Horror – Paikea (2014) – Silo Theatre
 Generation Z: Edinburgh Fringe Festival – as Frosty (2014) – Royale Productions
 Genration Z: Zombie Red Zone – as Frosty (2014) – Royale Productions
 The Wholehearted – as Performer/deviser (2016)
 Burn Her – as Lead (2018) – Massive Theatre Company
 Emilia – as Mary Sidney (2020)

Filmography

References

External links
 
 
 

Living people
New Zealand Māori people
New Zealand people of Scottish descent
21st-century New Zealand actresses
New Zealand actresses
New Zealand Māori actresses
New Zealand stage actresses
New Zealand film actresses
New Zealand television actresses
New Zealand soap opera actresses
1985 births